Robert Williamson may refer to:

Robert Williamson III (born 1970), American poker player
Robert McAlpin Williamson (1804–1859), Texas politician
Robert S. Williamson (1825–1882), American soldier
Robert B. Williamson (1892–1976), Maine judge
Robert Wood Williamson (1856–1932), British solicitor and anthropologist
Roy Williamson (bishop) (Robert Kerr Williamson, 1932–2019), British bishop
Robert Williamson (geneticist) (born 1938), British-Australian molecular biologist

See also
Bobby Williamson (born 1961), Scottish football player and manager (Rangers FC, Kilmarnock FC, Hibernian FC, Uganda national team)
Bobby Williamson (footballer, born 1933) (1933–1990), Scottish football player (St. Mirren FC)
Robbie Williamson (born 1969), Scottish former footballer
Robert Williamson Steele (1820–1901), Governor